Rodney "Rod" Milburn Jr. (May 18, 1950 – November 11, 1997) was an American athlete who won gold at the 1972 Summer Olympics in Munich in the 110m hurdles.

Career 

During the early 1970s, Milburn dominated the 110m hurdles, tying or breaking the world record for the 110 m hurdles/120 yards five times.
1971, as a sophomore at Southern University, was when Milburn announced himself on the national and world stage. Amongst his achievements that year was his first world record. In a semi-final of the USA Championships he broke the record for 120 y with 13.0 s. Milburn went on to win the title, in 13.1 s. Milburn was to remain undefeated in 1971, including winning the 110m hurdles event t the 1971 Pan-American Games. He also showed his versatility by winning a bronze as a member of the United States sprint relay team at the Pan-American Games. With these performances, Milburn earned the nickname "Hot Rod", and was awarded the Track and Field News Athlete of the Year Award. His home state, Louisiana, also recognised him by awarding him the James J. Corbett Award as the outstanding male athlete from the state in 1971. He was to receive the same award a second time in 1973.  He was the 1973 NCAA Indoor Champion for 60 yard hurdles.

The overwhelming favourite to qualify for the 1972 Munich Olympics. Milburn in fact struggled but did qualify in 3rd place at the USA Olympic Trials. In the final he hit hurdles due to the pressure of the world-record holder Willie Davenport running alongside him and only managed to hold the vital third and last qualifying place by a foot. In Munich Milburn won the gold medal in the 110m hurdles, tying the world record of 13.2 seconds, finishing ahead of Guy Drut and Thomas Hill. This time, which was recorded as 13.24 to the hundredth of a second, would become the first world record when only automatically recorded times would be ratified as world records.

Milburn's triumph was overshadowed by other events. The qualifying rounds for the 110 m hurdles event was delayed by the suspension of the games following the terrorist attack in the Olympic Village. The final itself was then overlooked due to the furor over the behaviour of the American 400 meter runners Vince Matthews and Wayne Collett on the medal rostrum at their medal award ceremony.

In 1973 Milburn continued to demonstrate he was the world's pre-eminent high-hurdler by breaking the world record for the 110 m hurdles with a 13.1 s, knocking 0.1 s off a record that had lasted for 14 years, and equalling his own world record for 120 y hurdles of 13.0 s. The record-breaking times in the 110 m hurdles happened on July 6 in Zurich, Switzerland and on July 22 in Sienna, Italy; the record-equalling time in the 120 y hurdles happened on June 20 in Eugene, Oregon.

After this season, with no prospect of playing American football professionally and not able to endorse commercial products as an amateur athlete, Milburn joined the fledgling professional athletics tour run by the International Track Association (ITA). He was to remain unbeaten in their 1974 season. The ITA folded in 1976. By running as a professional, Milburn was ineligible to compete at the Olympics and defend his title.

In 1975, Milburn tried briefly to become an American football player with the fledgling World Football League team the Shreveport Steamer. His try out was unsuccessful.

Milburn returned as a hurdler in 1980 in time for an attempt at an Olympic comeback. However, the boycott of the Olympics denied him that possibility. He did, however, run as an amateur for two seasons with some success against the new generation of high hurdlers.

Sporting commentators note that Milburn was important in the history of hurdling for introducing two innovations: the double-armed lead (to reduce time in the air) and the dime on the hurdle practice technique (knocking off dimes placed on the top of each hurdle without touching the actual hurdle).

Early life 

Milburn turned to the hurdles under the tutelage of his high school coach Claude Paxton at J.S. Clark High School in Opelousas, Louisiana.

By his senior year, he was the outstanding high school hurdler in the United States and broke the national age record for the 120 y hurdles at 13.5 s. Acknowledgments of his achievements at high school included being voted on the Louisiana Sports Writers Association All-State track and field team in both his junior and senior years.

Following high school, he went to Southern University in Baton Rouge, Louisiana, with an athletics scholarship.

Here he met Willie Davenport, the 1968 110 m hurdles champion, who recognised his potential as a future Olympic champion and mentored the young athlete. He was coached at college by Dick Hill who had coached amongst others Bob Hayes the 1964 100 m Olympic champion.

Later life 
Milburn finally retired from athletics in 1983. Milburn was appointed the head track coach at Southern University in Baton Rouge, Louisiana in 1984 by his old college coach, Dick Hill. When Hill left Southern University in 1987, his replacement did not renew Milburn's contract.

Milburn struggled after this and took a job as a utility crewman at a paper and pulp mill of the Georgia-Pacific Corporation in Port Hudson, Louisiana: it was while working at this plant that Milburn died after falling into a tank containing a sodium chlorate solution.

His death came as a huge shock to a track and field community that vividly remembered his achievements on the track. At his funeral, a message of condolence from President Bill Clinton and his wife, Hilary, was read.

For Milburn, it was a great misfortune that his best years came at a time when it was impossible for even an Olympic champion to earn a good living from track: by running professionally, he had made himself ineligible to defend his Olympic title in 1976, and was then denied a chance to run in the 1980 Olympics by the 1980 Olympics boycott even when his eligibility for entry was reinstated. In the end, a court injunction allowing the former professional athletes to run at the Olympic Trials came too late for Milburn to compete.

Milburn was honoured as one of Louisiana's top 50 athletes of the 20th Century by Sports Illustrated. and in 1988 was inducted into the Louisiana Sports Hall of Fame.

Rankings 
Milburn was ranked among the best in the USA and the world in the 110m hurdles, in two periods separated by his time on the professional athletics circuit, according to the votes of the experts of Track and Field News.

USA Championships

Milburn was a very successful competitor at 110 m hurdles in the USA National Track and Field Championships during two periods between 1970 and 1981 separated by his time on the professional athletics circuit.:

In addition, Milburn was four times United States champion indoors at 60 m/60 y hurdles – in 1972–73 and 1980–81. He also set world records indoors for 50 y hurdles in 5.8 s, the 55 m hurdles in 6.8 s, and the 60 y hurdles in 6.7 s.

Notes

References

External links
 http://www.trackandfieldnews.com/index.php/special-articles/134, Track and Field News Cover, II June 1971.
 http://www.trackandfieldnews.com/index.php/special-articles/133, Track and Field News Cover, January 1972.
Rod Milburn in the Hall of Fame of USA Track & Field
Progression of IAAF World Records 2011 Edition, Editor Imre Matrahazi, IAAF Athletics.
"Rodney Milburn, The Quiet Champion", Steve McGill, www.hurdlesfirst.com Personal Stories.
http://rodneymilburn.com/usa_track__field, rodneymilburn.com, Milburn & Associates Entertainment Group.

1950 births
1997 deaths
African-American male track and field athletes
American male hurdlers
Athletes (track and field) at the 1971 Pan American Games
Athletes (track and field) at the 1972 Summer Olympics
People from Opelousas, Louisiana
Track and field athletes from Louisiana
Southern University alumni
World record setters in athletics (track and field)
Olympic gold medalists for the United States in track and field
Pan American Games gold medalists for the United States
Pan American Games bronze medalists for the United States
Pan American Games medalists in athletics (track and field)
Accidental deaths in Louisiana
Industrial accident deaths
Medalists at the 1972 Summer Olympics
Track & Field News Athlete of the Year winners
Medalists at the 1971 Pan American Games
20th-century African-American sportspeople